Acceptance angle may refer to:

Half of the angular aperture of an optical system
Acceptance angle (optical fiber), the angle in an optical fiber below which rays are guided rays
Acceptance angle (solar concentrator)

See also
Numerical aperture